The use of tobacco for smoking in New Zealand has been subjected to government regulation for a number of decades. On 10 December 2004, New Zealand became the third country in the world to make all indoor workplaces including bars and restaurants smoke-free.

Consumption
The number of cigarettes available for consumption, a statistical measure that reflects sales, has generally been decreasing since they peaked at 6.3 billion in 1977 but consumption has remained constant from 2005 through to 2008 at 2.4 billion cigarettes. Over the last 30 years the number of cigarettes that have been available has dropped by 61.5%. The volume of tobacco available for consumption rose to a new high of 904 tonnes and was 83.3 percent higher than the lowest amount recorded in 1985.

Legislation
The first building in the world to have a smoke-free policy was the Old Government Building in Wellington in 1876. This policy was enacted over concerns about the threat of fire, as it was the second largest wooden building in the world.

The earliest attempt at tobacco control was in 1907, when the government moved to ban tobacco sales to persons under the age of 16, as it was feared that tobacco would "stunt" a minor's growth.  However, this law was not enforced until 1988.  In 1997, the age restriction was increased to 18 years. Although it is now illegal to sell tobacco products to a minor, a minor may still publicly consume, possess and distribute tobacco to friends without penalty (as opposed to alcohol).

The Smoke-free Environments Act 1990 was passed to prevent the effects of passive smoking on other people by restricting cigarette smoking in places such as workplaces and schools.

New Zealand passed an amendment to the Smoke-free Environments Act on 3 December 2003 (effective in 2004) which covers all indoor public workplaces and hospitality venues (pubs, bars, nightclubs, charter club bars, restaurants and casinos). Studies have shown very high levels of compliance with the law. Also, the air quality at indoor hospitality venues is very good compared to similar settings in other countries where smoking is still permitted.

Outdoor smoke-free laws cover the grounds of all schools, some council-owned parks (e.g., in South Taranaki and Upper Hutt), the grounds of some hospitals, stadiums and most university campuses. However, these laws are not strictly enforced apart from a polite request from security guards and property owners. The government has not moved to restrict smoking in cars, but has run mass media campaigns that promote smoke-free cars and homes.

Smoking on domestic flights was banned in 1988 and on all international flights as of 1996.

Cigarette advertising was banned on TV and radio in 1963, on cinemas and billboards in 1971, and in print media in 1990.  Tobacco sponsorship was phased out in 1995 and tobacco signage banned from outside shops the same year. Tobacco displays themselves were banned in 2012.

The sale of single cigarettes was banned in early 1998, and cigarettes are required to be sold in packs of no fewer than 20.

The New Zealand government's National Drug Policy 2007–2012 seeks to reduce the effects of tobacco use by limiting availability, limiting the use of tobacco, and reducing harm from existing tobacco use.

On 9 December 2021, Associate Health Minister Ayesha Verrall confirmed that the Sixth Labour Government would introduce legislation to significantly reduce the availability of tobacco products in the country, by prohibiting their sale to anyone born after 2008 (described as creating a "smokefree generation"), and restricting them to specialty stores only. There would also be a restriction on nicotine content. The announcement was praised by the Green Party and several health leaders including New Zealand Medical Association chair Alistair Humphrey, Health Coalition Aotearoa smokefree expert advisory group chair Sally Liggins, and University of Auckland Associate Dean of Pacific Collin Tukuitonga for addressing the health effects of smoking particularly within the Māori and Pasifika communities. By contrast, ACT health spokesperson Karen Chhour criticised the proposed legislation, stating that prohibition was unworkable and claiming that it would create a black market for tobacco products.

The Smokefree Environments Bill was passed on 13 December 2022, which will ban the sale of tobacco to anyone born after 1 January 2009.

Lobbying
On 5 September 2007, Action on Smoking and Health (ASH) called for the removal of tobacco from sale by 2017. Tobacco displays in shops were banned in 2012. Winston Peters, himself a smoker, has long been lobbying for the rights of smokers. In the 2016 New Zealand budget, ACT New Zealand also came out lobbying on behalf of smokers, arguing that although tax on tobacco had doubled in the last five years, smoking rates had only dropped by 1.3 percent.

Littering

The littering of cigarette butts is recognised as a pervasive issue in New Zealand. In the National Litter Audit conducted in 2019, cigarette butts were the most commonly found items.

A study conducted in urban Wellington in 2011 found that smokers littering cigarette butts was the norm, even when rubbish bins were nearby. Littering of cigarette butts was more common in the evening, where 85.8% of smokers were observed littering, compared with the afternoon, when 68.1% were observed littering. In addition, 73.5% of smokers did not extinguish their butts.

See also
Cannabis in New Zealand
Anti-smoking movement
Health effects of tobacco smoking
Smoke-free Environments Act 1990
Tobacco company
Tobacco industry
Litter in New Zealand

References

Further reading

External links
Ministry of Health - Tobacco Control and Smoking page
National Drug Policy New Zealand
Ministry of Health - links to lobby groups and stop smoking groups
Quitline NZ

 
Tobacco